Dmytro Ihorovych Povoroznyuk (born 14 September 1987) is a Ukrainian former football journalist, former futsal player, YouTuber, and professional footballer who plays as a centre-forward for Ukrainian club Veres Rivne.

References

External links
 
 
 

1987 births
Living people
Sportspeople from Rivne
Taras Shevchenko National University of Kyiv, Institute of International Relations alumni
University of Kyiv, Journalism Institute alumni
Ukrainian television journalists
Ukrainian sports journalists
Ukrainian association football commentators
5 Kanal people
Ukrainian YouTubers
Ukrainian men's futsal players
Ukrainian footballers
Association football forwards
NK Veres Rivne players
Ukrainian First League players